No One Does It Better may refer to:

No One Does It Better (album), 2000 SoulDecision album, and the title track
No One Does It Better (song), 2012 You Me at Six song
"No One Does It Better", song by The Spinners from The Fish That Saved Pittsburgh 1979 sampled on several hip-hop and rap albums

See also
Nobody Does It Better (disambiguation)